= Algerian Kardoun =

Ribbon

Kardoune
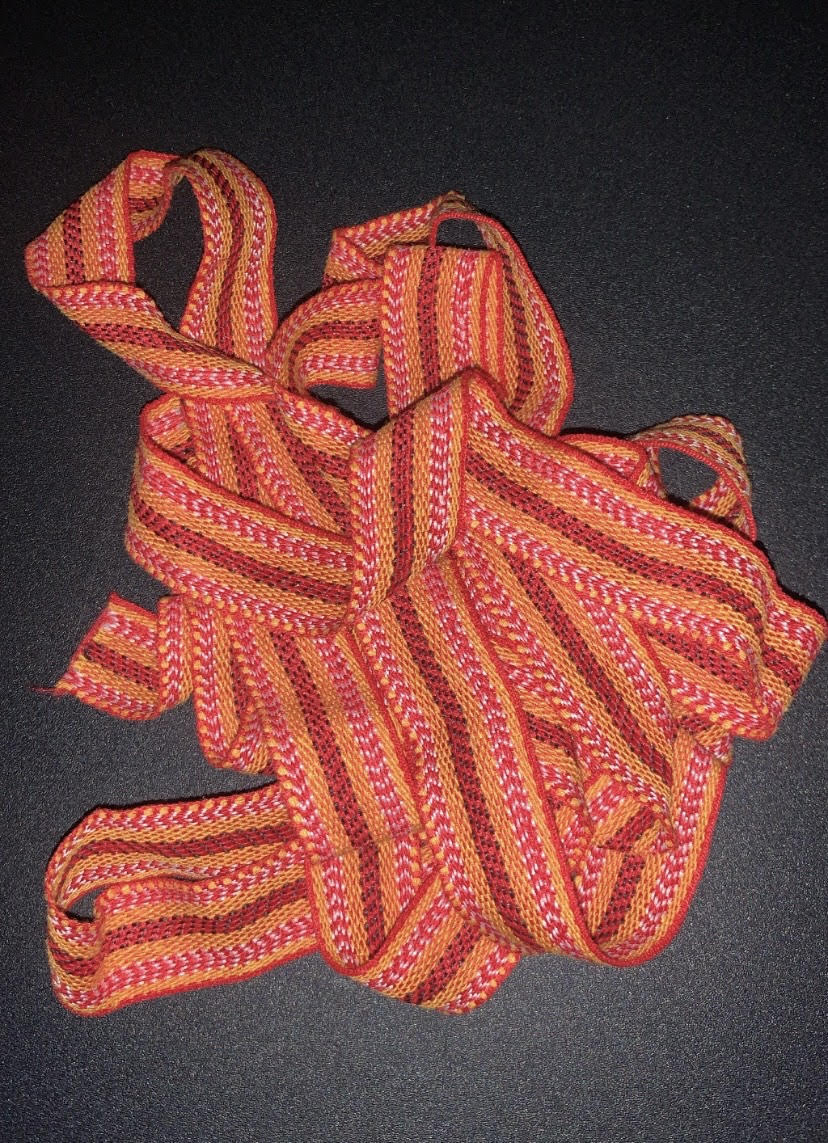
- Traditional Algerian kardoun.
- Alternative names: Kardoune, Kardoun, Kerdoune, Qardoun
- Place of origin: Algeria

Kardoun or Qardoun is a traditional Algerian hair accessory that is used to protect the hair and keep it straight. It is a long, narrow ribbon made of silk or cotton, usually red and orange, wrapped tightly around the head to flatten the hair and keep it in place. The ribbon is usually worn under a scarf or other head covering. The word "qardoun" comes from the Arabic word "qarad", which means to straighten or flatten.

The use of kardoun in Algeria dates back to the early 1800s, and it is still a popular hair accessory among Algerian women today. This is a cold straightening method that involves holding the hair tightly and for an extended period of time.

To use a kardoun, the hair is first brushed and gathered at the back of the head. The qardoun ribbon is then wrapped tightly around the head, starting from the root of the ponytail and working towards the ends. The ribbon is wrapped multiple times to create a flat and smooth surface, and then secured in place.

In addition to being a practical hair accessory, kardoun is also a symbol of Algerian cultural identity and heritage. Many Algerian women take pride in wearing the kardoun as a way to connect with their cultural roots and express their individuality.

The Algerian hair accessory has been featured in pop culture and fashion in recent years. In 2019, the British fashion brand ASOS released a range of headscarves inspired by North African and Middle Eastern cultures, which included the use of kardoun in their designs. In addition, several fashion bloggers and influencers have incorporated the kardoun into their hairstyles and showcased it on social media platforms such as Instagram. The kardoun has also been highlighted in various cultural events and exhibitions, such as the "North Africa United" event in Paris in 2018.
